Vizerra is a software platform for viewing 3D models which provides its user with integrated additional content, such as video guides. Currently available 3D models are used for demonstration, advertising and educational purposes.

Project Overview
The project title has its origins in Latin and combines three words: visio (”vision, image”), erro (”roam”) and terra (“earth”). It was chosen because Vizerra project began as a platform for virtual travel.

At the moment Vizerra is primarily a library of virtual 3D copies of real sites. These include monasteries, temples, squares and monuments of ancient cultures, such as Machu Picchu, Prague’s Old Town Square, Angkor Wat and others.

Client Application
The first version of Vizerra client application user interface was made by Art. Lebedev Studio.

Vizerra uses the following technologies:

Umbra by Umbra Software Ltd.; Wwise (WaveWorks Interactive Sound Engine) by Audiokinetic Inc; SpeedTree by Interactive Data Visualization, Inc.; Simplygon by Donya Labs AB; PhysX by Nvidia Corporation; DirectX by Microsoft ,  Gamebryo Lightspeed game engine from Emergent (previously NetImmerse Engine) and others.

References

Browsers